Yummy Mummies is an Australian reality television series that premiered on 9 July 2017 on the Seven Network. The show follows wealthy, expectant mums who support each other through the challenges of pregnancy and motherhood. 

Despite poor ratings and critical reception, the series was renewed for a second season, which premiered on 7plus in 2018. The series is also available on Netflix, where it is presented as a Netflix Original outside of Australia.

Episodes

Season 1
{| class="wikitable plainrowheaders" ;
|- style="color:black"
! scope="col" style="background: #2D5A88; color: #ffffff; width:6%;" | No. inseries
! scope="col" style="background: #2D5A88; color: #ffffff; width:6%;" | No. inseason
! scope="col" style="background: #2D5A88; color: #ffffff; width:31%;" | Title
! scope="col" style="background: #2D5A88; color: #ffffff; width:14%;" | Original air date
! scope="col" style="background: #2D5A88; color: #ffffff; width:21%;" | Australian viewers
|-

|}

Reception 
Yummy Mummies was panned by critics.

Writing for news.com.au, Debbie Schipp was highly critical of the show. Schipp described it as "fabricated, contrived, vapid, vacuous, pointless tripe". Schipp wrote that she had watched the show so others don't have to. Schipp further attacked the show as "not even car-crash. It’s cringe-making".

In The Sydney Morning Herald, Craig Mathieson wrote that "To call Yummy Mummies car-crash television is to understate how garish, stupid, weird, poorly executed, and dutifully offensive it is".

References

External links
 Official Netflix page
 Official 7plus page

2017 Australian television series debuts
2018 Australian television series endings
2010s Australian reality television series
Seven Network original programming
English-language television shows